Jorun Stiansen (born 20 January 1984 in Colombia) is a Norwegian pop singer and artist. She won the Idol version of Pop Idol in 2005.

She grew up with adoptive parents in Vennesla. She is the only winner of this version to have been born outside of Norway, and as of 2007 (season 5), the first (of two, Jenny Langlo won as the second female in 2011) female to have won.

Jorun Stiansen is one of only seven contestants in the Idol (Norway) history who succeeded in staying out of “bottom three/two” places in weekly votes along with Kurt Nilsen (season 1), Gaute Ormåsen (season 1), Susanne Nordbøe (season 2), Alejandro Fuentes (season 3), Tone Damli Aaberge (season 3) and Jonas Thomassen (season 4). Of them, only Nilsen and Stiansen went on to win the competition.

Idol Performances
Audition: "Saving All My Love For You" by Whitney Houston
Top 50: "Run To You" by Whitney Houston 
Top 12: "If I Ain't Got You" by Alicia Keys 
Top 11: "Scared" by Venke Knutson 
Top 10: "Work It Out" by Beyoncé Knowles 
Top 9:  "Angel" by Sarah McLachlan 
Top 8:  "What's Love Got To Do With It" by Tina Turner 
Top 7:  "Nine To Five" by Dolly Parton 
Top 6:  "We Can Work It Out" by The Beatles 
Top 5:  "Smile" by Westlife 
Top 4:  "The Greatest Love Of All" by Whitney Houston 
Top 4:  "Could I have This Kiss Forever (duet with Alejandro Fuentes) by Whitney Houston and Enrique Iglesias 
Top 3:  "Get This Party Started" by Pink 
Top 3:  "Too Lost In You" by Sugababes 
Finale: "What's Love Got To Do With It" by Tina Turner 
Finale: "If I Ain't Got You" by Alicia Keys 
Finale: "This Is The Night" (winnersingle) aka "The Last Goodbye" by Lara Fabian

Discography
Albums
Idol 2005 (April 2005)
 Unstable (August 2005)
 Sticky Hands (2008) -unreleased-

Singles
 This Is The Night (May 2005)
 Unstable (feat. Paperboys) (2005)
 Sticky Hands (2007)
 Batman (2008)

References

1984 births
Living people
People from Vennesla
Colombian emigrants to Norway
Norwegian adoptees
Norwegian pop singers
Idols (TV series) winners
Idol (Norwegian TV series) participants
21st-century Norwegian singers
21st-century Norwegian women singers